Giorgi Mazniashvili (6 April 1870 – 16 December 1937) was a Georgian general and one of the most prominent military figures in the Democratic Republic of Georgia (1918–1921). During the service in the Russian army, he was also known by a Russian transliteration of his surname – Mazniev.

Early life and education

Mazniashvili was born on 6 April 1870 in the village Sasireti, Tiflis Governorate, Russian Empire (present day Kaspi Municipality, Shida Kartli, Georgia). Having taken a proper military education, he was later promoted to general of the Russian army.

Career
Wounded in the Russo-Japanese war (1904–1905), he was visited at a hospital by the Tsar Nicholas II, who awarded him St George's Cross and invited the general to the palace. He fought also on the battlefields of World War I, but returned to Georgia after the February Revolution in 1917. He formed two national divisions and secured the capital Tbilisi from the chaotically retreating and increasingly Bolshevist Russian soldiers. In April 1918, he successfully defended the southwestern province Guria from the Ottoman offensive winning a victory on the Choloki River. In June 1918, he served as a governor general of Abkhazia and crushed there a pro-Bolshevik revolt; then he took Gagra, Sochi and Tuapse in the first phase of the Sochi conflict.

From October to December 1918, he served as a governor general of Tbilisi. During the December Georgian-Armenian war 1918, he was appointed a commander-in-chief and successfully defended the Georgian borders from the troops of General Dro. In 1919 he served as a governor general of Akhaltsikhe and Akhalkalaki and was moved, on 6 October 1920, as a commandant in Tbilisi. During the Soviet invasion of February 1921, he repulsed the Red Army from the Soghanlughi heights at the outskirts of Tbilisi. The war, however, was lost. Mazniashvili did not follow the country's leaders in exile, but mobilized the remnants of the Georgian armed forces to recover the Black Sea city of Batumi from the Turkish occupation, March 1921. The newly established Soviet government of Georgia declared him outlaw, but later offered him a nominal post in the Red Army.

Later life and death
In 1923, during the Red Terror, he was arrested and exiled to Persia whence he moved to France. In a few years, he was allowed to return and he lived in his native village Sasireti, far from political life. During the Great Purges, however, he was arrested and executed without a trial in 1937. In the 1950s, Mazniashvili's son, a World War II veteran of the Soviet army, submitted a request for a political rehabilitation of his father, but this was turned down by the authorities.

Legacy
Mazniashvili is the author of the popular Soldier’s Memoirs. In 2013, he was posthumously awarded the title and Order of National Hero of Georgia.

Personal life

Ancestry
According to historian Ucha Murghulia, Mazniashvili's father was Georgian officer of Russian Imperial Army Ivane Mazniashvili. However, according to other versions, attested by his stepchild's descendent Anouki Areshidze, Giorgi Mazniashvili's father was an ethnic Russian officer Ivan Mazniev.

References 

1872 births
1937 deaths
People from Shida Kartli
People from Tiflis Governorate
Memoirists from Georgia (country)
Generals from Georgia (country)
Georgian Soviet Socialist Republic
Great Purge victims from Georgia (country)
Russian military personnel of the Russo-Japanese War
People of World War I from Georgia (country)
National Heroes of Georgia
Georgian emigrants to France